Vesta is an unincorporated community in Owen Township, Clark County, Indiana, United States.

History
A post office was established at Vesta in 1884, and remained in operation until it was discontinued in 1902.

Geography

References

Unincorporated communities in Clark County, Indiana
Unincorporated communities in Indiana
Louisville metropolitan area